Rusudan Khoperia (born September 9, 1972) is a Georgian trampoline gymnast who represented Georgia at two Olympic Games (2000 and 2004), and with the former USSR at the 1988 Trampoline World Championships. She won 3 Olympic gold medals: two with the Soviet team as an individual and as a team member, and one in the synchro event with Elena Kolomeets.

External links
 

1972 births
Living people
Female trampolinists from Georgia (country)
Olympic gymnasts of Georgia (country)
Gymnasts at the 2000 Summer Olympics
Gymnasts at the 2004 Summer Olympics
Medalists at the Trampoline Gymnastics World Championships